Alba Vergés i Bosch (born 3 September 1978) is a Catalan economist and politician who is current serving as the First Vice President of the Parliament of Catalonia since 2021 and as Acting President of the Parliament of Catalonia since 2022.

Early life
Vergés was born on 3 September 1978 in Igualada, Catalonia, Spain. She has a degree in economics from the University of Barcelona and a degree in technical engineering in computer management from the Open University of Catalonia.

Career
Vergés worked as an economist in the elderly care and as a junior programmer in information and communications technology, developing clothing store management software. She was an administrative officer at the Colegio Oficial de Agentes Comerciales de Barcelona in Anoia and in charge of administration, accounting and finance at the Sociosanitario Consortium of Igualada, an organisation that manages public elder care centres, from 2008 to 2012.

Vergés joined the Republican Left of Catalonia (ERC) in 2011 and became president of its Igualada branch in 2012. She is a member of the Assemblea Nacional Catalana and La Teixidora. At the 2011 local elections Puigneró was placed 3rd on the Republican Left of Catalonia-Reagrupament-Acord Municipal electoral alliance's list of candidates in Igualada but the alliance only managed to win two seats in the municipality and as a result she was not elected.

Vergés contested the 2012 regional election as a Republican Left of Catalonia–Catalonia Yes (ERC–CatSí) electoral alliance candidate in the Province of Barcelona and was elected to the Parliament of Catalonia. She was re-elected at the 2015 and 2017 regional elections. She was elected to the Board of the Parliament of Catalonia as Fourth Secretary on 17 January 2018.

On 19 May 2018 newly elected President of Catalonia Quim Torra nominated a new government in which Toni Comín, who was in living in exile, was to be Minister of Health. However, the Spanish government condemned the inclusion of jailed/exiled politicians in the government as provocative and refused to approve Torra's appointments or to revoke direct rule. Faced with this opposition Torra announced a new government on 29 May 2018 without the jailed/exiled politicians. Vergés was to be Minister of Health in the new government. She was sworn in on 2 June 2018 at the Palau de la Generalitat de Catalunya. She resigned as Fourth Secretary on 4 June 2018 and as an MP on 14 June 2018.

Electoral history

References

External links
 
 

1978 births
Fourth Secretaries of the Parliament of Catalonia
Health ministers of Catalonia
Living people
Members of the 10th Parliament of Catalonia
Members of the 11th Parliament of Catalonia
21st-century Spanish women politicians
Members of the 12th Parliament of Catalonia
People from Igualada
Republican Left of Catalonia politicians
Torra Government
University of Barcelona alumni
Women members of the Parliament of Catalonia